Rafia Akhtar Dolly is a Awami League politician and the former Member of Parliament of women's reserved seat.

Career
Dolly was elected to parliament from women's reserved seat as an Awami League candidate in 1973. She was a member of the Governing body of Bangladesh Women's Rehabilitation and Welfare Foundation, formed by the Government of Bangladesh for rehabilitation of women raped during the Bangladesh Liberation war.

Dolly is the President of Bangladesh Women Sports Federation.

References

Awami League politicians
Living people
1st Jatiya Sangsad members
Women members of the Jatiya Sangsad
Year of birth missing (living people)
20th-century Bangladeshi women politicians